Walter Williams (born June 18, 1993), known as ZelooperZ, is an American rapper. He is a member of Detroit-based hip hop group Bruiser Brigade and is signed to their record label Bruiser Brigade Records.

Discography

Studio albums 
 Bothic (2016)
 A Piece of the Geto (with Shigeto) (2017)
 Wild Card (2019)
 Dyn-o-mite (2019)
 Gremlin (2020)
 Moszel Offline (2020)
 Valley of Life (2020)
 Van Gogh's Left Ear (2021)
 Get WeT.Radio (2022)

Mixtapes 
 Coon N The Room: Eating Ramen Noodles While Watching Roots on Bootleg (2011)
 Help (2014)

Guest appearances

References 

Living people
Midwest hip hop musicians
Rappers from Detroit
African-American male rappers
21st-century American rappers
21st-century American male musicians
1993 births
21st-century African-American musicians